H Williams was a supermarket chain in Ireland. H Williams collapsed in 1987, following a price war that led to the 1987 amendment to the Groceries Order in an effort to protect the market from further concentration.

The former H Williams supermarkets were sold to other supermarket chains.
H Williams' head office was situated in Dundrum, Dublin, also the site of Pye electric goods at one time, now close to the present town centre. There was also a store located there and said Rolls-Royce's, much more iconic then than now could be observed frequently.
Other stores included ones located in Rathmines, Terenure and Tallaght (now a Lidl).

References

Supermarkets of the Republic of Ireland
Retail companies disestablished in 1987